Ahmad Jamal Plays is an album by American jazz pianist Ahmad Jamal featuring performances recorded in 1955 and originally released on the short-lived Parrot label in 1955. The album was rereleased as Chamber Music of the New Jazz on the Argo label after Chess Records purchased the master tapes in 1956.

The cover was credited to Eric Anderson, Jr.

Critical reception 

Scott Yanow, in his review for AllMusic, says Jamal's "communication with Crawford and Crosby was often magical."

Track listing 
 "New Rhumba" (Ahmad Jamal) – 4:42
 "A Foggy Day" (George Gershwin, Ira Gershwin) – 4:26
 "All of You" (Cole Porter) – 3:19
 "It Ain't Necessarily So" (Gershwin, Gershwin) – 3:04
 "I Don't Wanna Be Kissed (By Anyone But You)" (Jack Elliot, Harold Spina) – 3:29
 "I Get a Kick Out of You" (Porter) – 4:53
 "Jeff" (Ray Crawford) – 4:56
 "Darn That Dream" (Eddie DeLange, Jimmy Van Heusen) – 3:14
 "Spring Is Here" (Lorenz Hart, Richard Rodgers) – 4:01

Personnel 
Ahmad Jamal – piano
Ray Crawford – guitar
Israel Crosby – bass

References 

Argo Records albums
Ahmad Jamal albums
1956 albums